The battle of Anfao was fought between the troops of rebel General Muhammad Askia and Sonni Baru, the legitimate ruler of the Songhai Empire on April 12, 1493 at Anfao, outside the capital of Gao, on the upper Niger. The victory of Muhammad Askia ended the Sonni dynasty.

Sources
The History of Africa: The Quest for Eternal Harmony, Molefi Kete Asante
The Cinematic Griot: The Ethnography of Jean Rouch, Paul Stoller
Battle of Anfao, Encyclopedia Britannica

Songhai Empire
Anfao
Anfao